Axundlu (also, Akhundly, Akhunly, and Khunly) is a village and municipality in the Agsu Rayon of Azerbaijan.  It has a population of 197.

References 

Populated places in Agsu District